KWES (1450 AM) is a radio station licensed to Ruidoso, New Mexico, United States. The station airs a country music format, and is currently owned by Walton Stations-New Mexico, Inc.

History
KWES signed on the air on August 15, 2008 with a classic country format. On January 19, 2009 KWES changed their format to sports with programming from Fox Sports Radio. On June 20, 2014 KWES changed their format from sports to Spanish adult hits, branded as "Juan 1450".

On February 19, 2018 KWES changed their format from Spanish adult hits to country, branded as "Bear Country 94.7".

References

External links
KWES's website

WES
Country radio stations in the United States